Park Tower is a lakefront high-rise residential building in the Edgewater neighborhood of Chicago.  It is one of the largest all-residential buildings in Chicago and the second-tallest building in Illinois outside of downtown Chicago.

Development
Originally constructed as 5415 Edgewater Beach, on the former site of the Edgewater Beach Hotel, it was renamed Park Tower and Mall in 1979 when it was converted from apartments to condominiums by Robert Sheridan & Partners. Eight of the original 728 apartments have been legally merged into four units, leaving a total of 724 condominiums.  Some adjoining walls betweens condos have also had doorways added without legally merging the units.

Each of the 52 residential floors had an identical layout, originally consisting of 14 units each.  The original units range from 565 to 1,258 square feet. The four merged units range from 1,815 to 2,516 ft2.  Total residential space is over 580k ft2.

Amenities
Most of the building's amenities are not included in residents' monthly assessments.  There is an underground parking garage that holds over 300 cars, but residents have to pay over $150/mo for a parking spot in it.  There is an underground laundromat, but residents have to pay per load for washers and per minute for dryers.  The second floor has both indoor and outdoor pools, a hut tub, rooms with weight lifting and cardio equipment, saunas, and a racquetball court, but residents have to pay over $25/mo to access them.  Residents can rent the second-floor party room for $150. There is a ground-floor bicycle room, but spots in it cost at least $48/yr.  While the preceding charges are optional, residents are required to pay RCN over $60/mo for Internet and cable TV.

Mall
Attached to Park Tower, at 5419 N Sheridan Rd, is a mall with 16 commercial units.  Originally intended for retailers and services targeting Park Tower residents, the only remaining retailer is family-owned Chicago-area supermarket chain Go Grocer.  The remainder of the units have been converted to office space, much of which has been taken by Lettuce Entertain You Enterprises.  Park Tower Condominium Association, the governing body for Park Tower and Mall, uses one of the mall offices.  The mall also has a First American Bank ATM and public UPS, USPS, and FedEx drop boxes.

See also
 List of buildings
 List of skyscrapers
 List of tallest buildings in Chicago
 List of tallest buildings in the United States
 World's tallest structures

References
 
 Emporis
  Pages 10-19

Residential condominiums in Chicago
Residential skyscrapers in Chicago
Residential buildings completed in 1973
1973 establishments in Illinois
North Side, Chicago